A pneumatic tool, air tool, air-powered tool or pneumatic-powered tool is a type of power tool, driven by compressed air supplied by an air compressor. Pneumatic tools can also be driven by compressed carbon dioxide stored in small cylinders allowing for portability.

Most pneumatic tools convert the compressed air to work using a pneumatic motor. Compared to electric power tool equivalents, pneumatic tools are safer to run and maintain, without risk of sparks, short-circuiting or electrocution, and have a higher power to weight ratio, allowing a smaller, lighter tool to accomplish the same task. Furthermore, they are less likely to self-destruct in case the tool is jammed or overloaded.

General grade pneumatic tools with a short life span are commonly less expensive and considered “disposable tools” in tooling industries, while industrial grade pneumatic tools with long life span are more expensive. In general, pneumatic tools are cheaper than the equivalent electric-powered tools. Regular lubrication of the tools is still needed however.

Most pneumatic tools are to be supplied with compressed air at 4 to 6 bar.

Advantages and disadvantages 
Pneumatic tools have many benefits which have contributed to their rise in popularity. The benefits of using compressed air to power tools are:

 Inexpensive
 Safe to use
 Easy to operate
 Portable
 Low theft rates

The primary disadvantage of pneumatic tools is the need for an air compressor, which can be expensive. Pneumatic tools also need to be properly maintained and oiled regularly. Failing to maintain tools can lead to deterioration, due to a build up residual oil and water.

Technical terms 
Pneumatic tools are rated using several metrics: Free Speed (rpm), Air Pressure (psi/bar), Air Consumption (cfm/scfm or m3/min), Horse Power (hp), and spindle size. Each individual tool has its own specific requirements which determine their compatibility with air compressor systems.

Flow or airflow, related to air consumption in pneumatic tools, represents the quantity of compressed air that passes through a section over a unit of time. It is represented in l/min, m3, at the equivalent value in free air in conditions of standard reference atmosphere (SRA). For example: +20 c, 65% of relative humidity, 1013 mbar, in accordance with norms NFE.

Types of pneumatic tools 
Pneumatic tools come in many shapes and form, including small and large-sized hand tools.

The most common types of pneumatic tools include:

Air ratchet
Airbrush
Air hammer (forging)
Air hammer (pile driver)
Angle grinder
Backfill tamper
 Impact wrenches
Nail gun
Jackhammer
Pneumatic hammer
Pneumatic drill
 Pneumatic jack (device)
 Pneumatic paint shaker
 Pneumatic riveter
 Sanders
Sandblaster
Shears
Paint sprayer
Riveting hammer
 Needle scaler

Common brands 

 Chicago Pneumatic
 Kirloskar Pneumatic 
 AIMCO
 AIRCAT
 Apex Tool Group
 Atlas Copco
 ZIPP GROUP
 Campbell Hausfeld
 3M 
 China Pneumatic
 Compair Broomwade Ltd
 Craftsman
 DeVilbiss Air Power Company
 Festo
 Husky (tools)
 Ingersoll-Rand
 JET
 Kobalt (tools)
 Mac Tools
 Master Palm
 Makita
 Matco Tools
 Osaka
 Patco Air Tools
 Porter-Cable
 RAD Torque Systems
 Snap-on
 ZIPP TOOL
Katashi
 SUMAKE
 Nex Flow
 Universal Tool

References